Md. Mokhlesur Rahman is a Bangladesh Awami League politician and the former Member of Parliament of Thakurgaon-3.

Career
Rahman was elected to parliament from Thakurgaon-3 as a Bangladesh Awami League candidate in 1991.

References

Awami League politicians
Living people
5th Jatiya Sangsad members
Year of birth missing (living people)